Every Woman Has Something (German: Jede Frau hat etwas) is a 1931 American comedy film directed by Leo Mittler and starring Trude Berliner, Willy Clever and Kurt Vespermann. It is the German-language version of the 1930 film Honey. Several other language versions were made, as was common in the early years of sound when multi-language versions were made to release in different countries.

Cast
 Trude Berliner as Olivia Dangerfield  
 Willy Clever as Burton 
 Kurt Vespermann as Charles Dangerfield, Bruder 
 Annie Ann as Cora Falkner, Tochter  
 Ida Perry as Frau Falkner 
 Karl Harbacher as Weeks  
 Kurt Lilien as Williams, Privatdetektiv  
 Zacharova as Mayme, Stubenmädchen 
 Alexandra Nalder as Doris, ihre Tochter

References

Bibliography
 Babett Stach & Helmut Morsbach. German film posters: 1895 - 1945. Walter de Gruyter, 1992.

External links
 

1931 films
American comedy films
1931 comedy films
1930s German-language films
Films directed by Leo Mittler
Paramount Pictures films
Films shot in France
Films shot at Joinville Studios
American multilingual films
American black-and-white films
Films based on works by Alice Duer Miller
1931 multilingual films
1930s American films